Ștefan C. Șendrea (1842–July 30, 1907) was a Moldavian, later Romanian jurist and politician.

Born in Huși, Șendrea obtained a doctorate in law from the University of Paris and one in political and administrative sciences from the Free University of Brussels. After returning to Romania, he secured a position as professor at the law faculty of the University of Iași in 1867, transferring to the University of Bucharest in 1897. He entered politics at Iași, joining the Free and Independent Faction in 1869, later adhering to the National Liberal Party (PNL). He was a diplomatic agent at Paris from October 1876 to April 1877, in the run-up to international recognition of Romania's independence. He was first elected Senator in 1879 and Deputy in 1884, taking part in a number of Liberal as well as Conservative legislatures. Șendrea served as Justice Minister in the Petre S. Aurelian cabinet, from November 1896 to March 1897. After the cabinet fell, he joined the drapelist faction, but re-entered the main PNL in 1899. He was President of the Assembly of Deputies from December 9 to 23, 1904. He committed suicide by jumping out of a train along the Budapest-Vienna line.

Notes

1842 births
1907 deaths
People from Huși
University of Paris alumni
Free University of Brussels (1834–1969) alumni
Academic staff of Alexandru Ioan Cuza University
Academic staff of the University of Bucharest
Romanian jurists
Romanian diplomats
Free and Independent Faction politicians
National Liberal Party (Romania) politicians
Members of the Chamber of Deputies (Romania)
Presidents of the Chamber of Deputies (Romania)
Members of the Senate of Romania
Romanian Ministers of Justice
Suicides by jumping in Hungary
Romanian politicians who committed suicide